Dooryard Bloom is a composition for solo baritone and orchestra by the American composer Jennifer Higdon.  The work was commissioned by the Brooklyn Philharmonic in 2004 and was premiered on April 16, 2005 by the baritone Nmon Ford and the Brooklyn Philharmonic under the conductor Michael Christie.  The piece is adapted from the poem "When Lilacs Last in the Dooryard Bloom'd" by the American author Walt Whitman.

Composition

Background
Dooryard Bloom has a duration of roughly 23 minutes.  The music was set to text adapted from Walt Whitman's poem "When Lilacs Last in the Dooryard Bloom'd", a process Higdon described in the score program notes as "a near impossible task".  Higdon further explained:
Whitman's poem had also famously been adapted to music by composer Paul Hindemith for his 1946 requiem When Lilacs Last in the Dooryard Bloom'd: A Requiem for those we love.

Instrumentation
The work is scored for solo baritone and an orchestra comprising two flutes, two oboes (2nd doubling English horn), two clarinets, two bassoons, two French horns, two trumpets, harp, two percussionists, and strings.

Reception
Reviewing the world premiere, Allan Kozinn of The New York Times called Dooryard Bloom "a substantial new score" and praised Higdon's vocal and orchestra writing.  Kozinn added, "Most crucially, though, her setting matches and magnifies the charged emotional arc of Whitman's text, with its inexorable passion, its submerged anger and the peaceful acceptance of its final lines."  The music critic Steve Smith praised the piece as Higdon's "most trenchant work and among her loveliest."  David Patrick Stearns of The Philadelphia Inquirer called it "a thoroughly attractive piece," but added:

See also
List of compositions by Jennifer Higdon

References

Compositions by Jennifer Higdon
2004 compositions
Compositions for symphony orchestra
Musical settings of poems by Walt Whitman
Music commissioned by the Brooklyn Philharmonic